
The Berkshire Museum is a museum of art, natural history, and ancient civilization that is located in Pittsfield in Berkshire County, Massachusetts ( United States).

History
The Berkshire Museum, founded by local paper magnate Zenas Crane, opened in 1903. The building was designed by the local architect Henry Seaver. 

The museum's first curator was Harlan H. Ballard, who stayed in that role until early 1931.  He was replaced by Laura M. Bragg who became director of the museum.

When Ellen Crane, Zenas's wife, died in 1934, she left a bequest of $100,000 to the museum.

Gallery

Renovations
The Feigenbaum Hall of Innovation opened in March 2008. This new hall falls in line with the museum's traditional "curiosity cabinet" appeal and is dedicated to local innovators.

In October 2014, Berkshire Museum's "Dino Dig" paleontology exhibition was replaced by Spark!Lab, a hands-on, inventors laboratory space developed by the Jerome and Dorothy Lemelson Center for the Study of Invention and Innovation at the National Museum of American History.

Sale of art controversy 
In July 2017, the Board of Directors at the Berkshire Museum announced a plan to sell the most significant portion of their art collection including two Norman Rockwell paintings, Blacksmith’s Boy – Heel and Toe (Shaftsbury Blacksmith Shop) (1940) and Shuffleton’s Barbershop (1950), which were given to the museum by Norman Rockwell himself. They contracted with Sotheby's to auction a total of 40 pieces from their collection. The art was removed from the museum before the sale was announced, and museum officials initially refused to name the works that were to be sold. The estimated proceeds from the sale would be $50 million. The art sale created considerable controversy not only among the residents of Berkshire County, but within the larger art world. The Massachusetts Attorney General's brief of October 30, 2017, supported opposition to the sale and joined the plaintiffs in court.

On November 1, 2017, before a packed courthouse, Judge John A. Agostini heard arguments on both sides of the controversy centered on the right of the plaintiffs to sue. His ruling was published on November 7, denying the plaintiffs’ motion for a preliminary injunction and dismissing the non-governmental plaintiffs for lack of standing. Nevertheless, the Massachusetts Appeals Court granted a temporary injunction to halt the sale that expired on December 11. The sale was opposed by members of the museum as well as the descendants of Norman Rockwell, who donated work to the museum with the understanding that it would always remain at the museum. Museum organizations condemned the plan to sell the items, with the state’s lawyers asserting that the museum intended to sell nearly all of its valuable art to subsidize operating and other expenses. After months of negotiating at the Appellate Court level, a tentative settlement was reached on February 9, 2018, between the plaintiffs and the Attorney General's office. As of March 20, that settlement was in the hands of Justice David A. Lowy of the Massachusetts Supreme Judicial Court, following a hearing involving lawyers from the Massachusetts Attorney General’s office, the museum, and two separate groups of plaintiffs opposing the settlement.

On April 11, 2018, it was announced that the Berkshire Museum had sold Shuffleton's Barbershop by Rockwell to the Lucas Museum of Narrative Art for an undisclosed amount. The painting was to be loaned to the Norman Rockwell Museum in nearby Stockbridge for display into 2020. Other works, including Blacksmith’s Boy – Heel and Toe, were scheduled for sale at a Sotheby's auction in May 2018. Shortly after these initial sales, museum director Van Shields suddenly retired. In late November 2018, the museum announced that it had completed its sale of artworks, having raised $53.25 million through the sale of 22 pieces.

References

External links

Berkshire Museum within Google Arts & Culture

Museums in Pittsfield, Massachusetts
Natural history museums in Massachusetts
Art museums and galleries in Massachusetts
Aquaria in Massachusetts
Museums established in 1903
1903 establishments in Massachusetts
Association of Science-Technology Centers member institutions
Paleontology in Massachusetts